In Greek mythology, Danaë was an Argive princess and mother of the hero Perseus by Zeus. She was credited with founding the city of Ardea in Latium during the Bronze Age.

Family 
Danae was the daughter and only child of King Acrisius of Argos by his wife Queen Eurydice or Aganippe. In some accounts, she had a sister, Evarete, wife of King Oenomaus of Pisa and mother of Hippodamia.

Mythology 
Disappointed by his lack of male heirs, King Acrisius asked the oracle of Delphi if this would change. The oracle announced to him that he would never have a son, but his daughter would, and that he would be killed by his daughter's son. At the time, Danaë was childless and, meaning to keep her so, King Acrisius shut her up in a bronze chamber to be constructed under the court of his palace (other versions say she was imprisoned in a tall brass tower with a single richly adorned chamber, but with no doors or windows, just a sky-light as the source of light and air). She was buried in this tomb, with the intent that she be closed off from all others for the rest of her life. However, Zeus, the king of the gods, desired her, and came to her in the form of golden rain which streamed in through the roof of the subterranean chamber and down into her womb. Soon after, their child Perseus was born.

Unwilling to provoke the wrath of the gods or the Furies by killing his offspring and grandchild, King Acrisius cast Danaë and Perseus into the sea in a wooden chest. The sea was calmed by Poseidon and, at the request of Zeus, the pair survived. They were washed ashore on the island of Seriphos, where they were taken in by Dictys—the brother of King Polydectes—who raised Perseus to manhood. The King was charmed by Danaë, but she had no interest in him. Consequently, he agreed not to marry her only if her son would bring him the head of the Gorgon Medusa. Using Athena's shield, Hermes's winged sandals and Hades's helmet of invisibility, Perseus was able to evade Medusa's gaze and decapitate her.

Later, after Perseus brought back Medusa's head and rescued Andromeda, the oracle's prophecy came true. He started for Argos, but learning of the prophecy, instead went to Larissa, where athletic games were being held. By chance, an aging Acrisius was there and Perseus accidentally struck him on the head with his javelin (or discus), fulfilling the prophecy.

Genealogy

Gallery

See also
 
 Pseudo-Apollodorus, Bibliotheke
 Danae-class cruiser
 The asteroid 61 Danaë, named after her

Notes

References 

Gaius Julius Hyginus, Fabulae from The Myths of Hyginus translated and edited by Mary Grant. University of Kansas Publications in Humanistic Studies. Online version at the Topos Text Project.
Pseudo-Apollodorus, The Library with an English Translation by Sir James George Frazer, F.B.A., F.R.S. in 2 Volumes, Cambridge, MA, Harvard University Press; London, William Heinemann Ltd. 1921. Online version at the Perseus Digital Library. Greek text available from the same website.
Smith, William; Dictionary of Greek and Roman Biography and Mythology, London (1873). "Danae" , Acri'sius

External links

 Warburg Institute Iconographic Database (ca. 100 images of Danae) 

Abantiades (mythology)
Princesses in Greek mythology
Mortal women of Zeus
Denyen